Wilga can refer to:

Places
 Wilga, Masovian Voivodeship (east-central Poland)
 Wilga, Western Australia a town in Western Australia
 Wilga, Burkina Faso, a town in Burkina Faso
 Wilga or Il-Wilga is a zone in Għarb, Gozo, Malta
 Wilga Road, Welwyn, Hertfordshire, England

Rivers
 Wilga (Garwolin), a river in Garwolin county, Poland
 Wilga (Krakow), a river that joins the Vistula in Krakow, Poland

Other
 Wilga (tree), a small tree of Australia
 PZL-104 Wilga, a Polish plane
 wilga, a domed shelter of Wilga twigs made by some Australian Aboriginal peoples 
 , a tugboat